Ware is an unincorporated community in Jefferson County, in the U.S. state of Missouri.

History
A post office called Ware was established in 1882, and remained in operation until 1906. The community has the name of Bob Ware, a local storekeeper.

References

Unincorporated communities in Jefferson County, Missouri
Unincorporated communities in Missouri